This is a list of episodes from the seventh season of Alice.

Episodes

Broadcast history
The season was aired Wednesday nights at 9:00-9:30 pm (EST) from October 6 to November 10, 1982, before being moved to Sunday nights at 9:30-10:00 pm (EST) where it aired on January 9 and January 16, 1983  before being switched to Mondays at 9:00-9:30pm (EST). It was again moved to Sunday nights at 9:30-10-00 pm (EST) on May 1, 1983  before the airing time was switched to 8:00-8:30 pm (EST) on Sundays on September 18, 1983.

References

1982 American television seasons
1983 American television seasons